The 2006 Copa Aerosur was the 4th edition of the Copa Aerosur, the annual Bolivian football tournament held in La Paz, Cochabamba and Santa Cruz, sponsored by AeroSur airline. 

Blooming won the tournament and their first title after beating The Strongest in the final 6–1 on aggregate.

First stage

|}

Second stage

Semi-final

Final

First leg

Second leg

 Away goal rules.

References 

2006
2006 domestic association football cups
2006 in Bolivian football